Elbridge Durbrow (September 21, 1903 – May 16, 1997) was a Foreign Service officer and diplomat who served as the Counselor of Embassy and Deputy Chief of Mission in Moscow in the late 1940s and then as the US ambassador to South Vietnam from March 14, 1957, to April 16, 1961.  He supported the Diem regime until late 1960, when he reported that the situation was deteriorating and that unless steps were taken to reform the government, Diem would be likely overthrown in a coup, or lose the country to the Viet Cong. Diem and his American supporters worked to get Durbrow transferred, and he was recalled by President John F. Kennedy in 1961, and sent to a diplomatic role with NATO in Europe.

Early life
Durbrow was born in San Francisco, California. Durbrow graduated from Yale University in 1926 with a degree in philosophy. He then continued his education at Stanford University, the University of Dijon in France, The Hague Academy of International Law in the Netherlands, the École Libre des Sciences Politiques in Paris and finally the University of Chicago, where he studied international economics and finance.

Career
Durbrow began his career in the US Foreign Service by serving as Vice Consul at the American embassy in Poland. He rose through the service's ranks over the next decade and served in Bucharest, Naples, Rome, Lisbon, and Moscow. In 1941, Durbrow became the assistant chief of the US State Department's Eastern European affairs division.

In 1944, Durbrow was appointed as the chief of the Eastern European division of the State Department in Washington, DC. That year, he was also one of the American delegates at the United Nations Monetary and Financial Conference, which set up the International Bank for Reconstruction and Development, the General Agreement on Tariffs and Trade (GATT), the International Monetary Fund (IMF), and the Bretton Woods system of money management. After World War II, Durbrow was vocal in his opposition for the diplomatic recognition of new governments in Hungary, Romania, and Bulgaria because of their communist origins. In 1946, he left that position to succeed George F. Kennan as the Counselor of Embassy and Deputy Chief of Mission in Moscow, under the US ambassador to the Soviet Union and future CIA Director, Walter Bedell Smith. Durbrow warned Smith and others of Soviet expansionism and efforts to break up the Western world.

From 1948 to 1950, he served as an adviser to the National War College in Washington, DC, and spent the next two years as director of the Foreign Service's personnel division. In 1952, he was sent to Italy, where he served as deputy chief of mission to the US ambassador to Italy, Clare Boothe Luce. Two years later, he was promoted to the diplomatic rank of career minister.

On March 14, 1957, President Dwight Eisenhower named Durbrow as the United States Ambassador to South Vietnam. At the time, the US had a minor military and political presence in Vietnam to prevent communism from taking over the region.

Durbrow had a difficult time in his ambassadorial role. He often had to work with the authoritarian regime of Ngo Dinh Diem and the corruption and ineffective policymaking that accompanied it. South Vietnamese officers, disgruntled with Diem's government, tried to persuade Durbrow into joining anti-Diem groups.

Durbrow began to feel uneasy about Diem's authority, had to refuse because the US government was still supported Diem.

In 1960, Diem and his younger brother and chief political adviser, Ngo Dinh Nhu, accused Durbrow of supporting a failed coup attempt by paratroopers of the Army of the Republic of Vietnam. Durbrow later recalled receiving a phone call from one of Diem's aides, who asked him to tell Diem to surrender or face a howitzer attack on the presidential palace. Durbrow refused, and no attack occurred. He later learned that the aide had been forced to make the call.

In April 1961, President John F. Kennedy formed a committee to assess the political, military, and socioeconomic situation in Vietnam, in the hope of determining what it would take to keep Communism out of South Vietnam. On April 16, Kennedy replaced Durbrow with Frederick Nolting, who supported appeasement. Later, Durbrow served as a delegate to the NATO Council in Paris and later as a government adviser to the National War College and the Air University.

Retirement
Durbrow retired from his 38-year diplomatic career in 1968. He spent the next two decades writing and lecturing on foreign affairs. Throughout the 1970s, he served as the chairman of the American Foreign Policy Institute and as the director of the Center for International Strategic Studies and the Freedom Studies Center in South Boston, Virginia.

Durbrow died at his home in Walnut Creek, California on May 16, 1997, from complications of a stroke. He was survived by his second wife, Benice Balcom Durbrow, and two sons from his first marriage, Chandler and Bruce.

References

Further reading
 Adamson, Michael R. "Ambassadorial Roles and Foreign Policy: Elbridge Durbrow, Frederick Nolting, and the US Commitment to Diem's Vietnam, 1957–61." Presidential Studies Quarterly 32.2 (2002): 229–255.
 Frankum Jr, Ronald Bruce. Vietnam's Year of the Rat: Elbridge Durbrow, Ngo Đinh Diệm and the Turn in US Relations, 1959-1961 (McFarland, 2014).

1903 births
1997 deaths
Ambassadors of the United States to South Vietnam
Writers from San Francisco
Yale College alumni
The Hague Academy of International Law people
United States Foreign Service personnel